Sydney-Cook was an electoral district of the Legislative Assembly in the Australian state of New South Wales, created in 1894 in inner Sydney from part of the electoral district of South Sydney and named after James Cook.

Members for Cook

History
Multi-member constituencies were abolished in the 1893 redistribution, resulting in the creation of 76 new districts, including Sydney-Cook. Sydney-Cook consisted of a southern part of the four member district of South Sydney. It was in southern Surry Hills bounded by Foveaux Street in the north, Cleveland Street in the south and Elizabeth Street in the west, while the eastern boundary was a dog-leg from Riley Street south to Tudor Street, east via Davies Street and Nobbs Street and then South Dowling Street. In 1904, it was replaced by Surry Hills.

Election results

References

Former electoral districts of New South Wales
Constituencies established in 1894
1894 establishments in Australia
Constituencies disestablished in 1904
1904 disestablishments in Australia